Raksha Bandhan is a 2022 Indian Hindi-language family comedy-drama film directed by Aanand L. Rai and written by Himanshu Sharma and Kanika Dhillon. It stars Akshay Kumar, Bhumi Pednekar, Sadia Khateeb, Sahejmeen Kaur, Smrithi Srikanth and Deepika Khanna.

The film was theatrically released on 11 August 2022, coinciding with Raksha Bandhan and Independence Day. It received mixed to positive reviews from critics but was a commercial failure.

Plot
Lala Kedarnath, the eldest and only brother of four sisters named Gayatri, Durga, Laxmi and Saraswati, runs a chaat shop named Premlata Chat Bhandar that was started by his grandfather. Lala promises his frail mother on her deathbed that he will only get married after he fulfills the responsibility of marrying his sisters into suitable homes first. Lala's relentless efforts of getting his sisters married while upholding his family values go in vain, as he faces hurdles to find suitable grooms due to Laxmi's dark skin, Durga's weight and Saraswati's masculine behaviour. At the same time, Lala's commitment to his sisters stands as a huge roadblock for his and his childhood love Sapna's relationship to take off. 

Understanding the importance of Lala's vow, Sapna decides to wait till his goal is achieved. But her father Harishankar always nags her to get married. Sometime later, Lala manages to gather  for Gayatri's dowry. Gayatri gets married. After the marriage, it is revealed that Lala is not their real brother and that their mother adopted him long ago when his real mother died near temple. Lala arranges money for Durga and Laxmi's wedding by selling his one kidney, but things didn't go as planned when Gayatri commits suicide by drinking poison. Her husband and in-laws were asking for more dowry, She didn't say anything to Lala as she didn't want him to get more stressed. Lala realizes the curse of dowry system, and vows that he will make his other three sisters capable enough for their future so they can choose their own groom and marry without a dowry. 

Lala breaks all ties with Sapna and asks her to marry the guy of her father's choice. On Sapna's wedding day, Harishankar realizes that she still is in love with Lala and asks her to break the alliance. Sapna breaks the marriage and decides to wait for Lala. 12 years later, Laxmi marries Swapnil, with whom Sapna was getting married but he falls for Laxmi after she broke the engagement. Durga completes her graduation and becomes a lawyer, where she gets Gayathri's husband punished by sending him to prison on charges of dowry. Later she marries her classmate. Saraswati becomes a cop and marries her colleague. At last, Lala marries Sapna at the age of 60 after fulfilling his mother's wish.

Cast 
 Akshay Kumar as Lala Kedarnath Agarwal 
 Bhumi Pednekar as Sapna Gupta
 Sadia Khateeb as Gayatri Mishra
 Deepika Khanna as Durga Kedarnath
 Smrithi Srikanth as Laxmi Verma
 Sahejmeen Kaur as Saraswati
 Seema Pahwa as Shanoo Sharma
 Neeraj Sood as Harishankar
 Sahil Mehta as Gaffar
 Abhilash Thapliyal as Swapnil Verma
 Manu Rishi as Maternal Uncle
 Karan Puri as Sunil Mishra
 Salim Siddiqui as Neelu's Husband

Production

Development
The film was officially announced on 3 August 2020 to mark the occasion of Raksha Bandhan. Akshay Kumar stated that it is the quickest film he has signed in his career, and dedicated the film to his sister Alka Hiranandani who also serves as co-producer.Originally this film is scheduled to release on 13 December 2021.

Filming
Principal photography for the film commenced on 23 January 2021. First schedule ended in July 2021 at Mumbai. The film was wrapped up in Delhi on December 2021.

Music 

The songs were composed by Himesh Reshammiya while film score was composed and produced by Ishaan Chhabra. Irshad Kamil has written the lyrics.
The first song of the album "Tere Sath Hoon Main", sung by Nihal Tauro was released on 29 June 2022.
The second song "Kangan Ruby", sung by Reshammiya himself was released on 6 July 2022. The third song titled "Done Kar Do", sung by Navraj Hans was released on 18 July 2022 and it was the first song from an Indian film to have an international release, being launched in the UK. The fourth song "Dhaagon Se Baandhaa", sung by Shreya Ghoshal and Arijit Singh was released on 28 July 2022.

Marketing
The cast of Raksha Bandhan was on a promotional spree, visiting different cities across India, ahead of its release. The team, including Akshay Kumar, Aanand L Rai, Sadia Khateeb, Smrithi Srikanth, Sahejmeen Kaur and Deepika Khanna, visited Dubai, Pune and Indore and Hyderabad. On 7 August 2022, the team of Raksha Bandhan film visited Hyderabad to attend a press conference at a multiplex. Akshay took his on-screen sisters to the famous MG Road at Durga Gold and Silver (Durga Jewellers), for some pearl shopping and continued the tradition of gifting.

Release

Theatrical
The film was theatrically released on 11 August 2022, coinciding with Raksha Bandhan and Independence Day.

Home media
The digital streaming rights of the film were acquired by ZEE5. The film digitally was released on ZEE5 from 5 October 2022.

Reception

Box office 
Raksha Bandhan earned 8.20 crores at the domestic box office on its opening day. On the second day, the film collected 6.40 crore. On the third day, the film collected 6.51 crore. On the fourth day, the film collected 7.05 crore taking a total domestic weekend collection to 28.16 crore.

Critical response 
The film received mixed to positive reviews from critics. A critic for Bollywood Hungama rated the film 3.5 out of 5 stars and wrote "The Akshay Kumar starrer Raksha Bandhan is a touching family saga, with a highly emotional second half that uplifts the film". Aman Wadhwa of DNA India rated the film 3 out of 5 stars and wrote "Akshay Kumar's heartfelt and earnest performance is the biggest strength of Raksha Bandhan". Archika Khurana of The Times of India rated the film 2.5 out of 5 stars and wrote "This highly emotional drama doesn't fail to touch you, but it had the potential to be a far more entertaining watch". Zinia Bandyopadhyay of News 18 rated the film 2.5 out of 5 stars and wrote "it is one of those films that you can watch with the entire family, as they come together for Raksha Bandhan. Moreover, it will make you laugh and cry in equal parts". 

In contrast, Nandini Ramnath of Scroll.in rated the film 2 out of 5 stars and wrote "Raksha Bandhan harps away on the evils of the bride price practice before concluding that in an ideal world, women should be the ones demanding dowry". Shubhra Gupta of The Indian Express rated the film 1.5 out of 5 stars and wrote "Do the filmmakers truly believe that such low-rent family dramas, with their uneasy mix of humour and crassness, is the way out for a beleaguered Bollywood?". Saibal Chatterjee of NDTV rated the film 1 out of 5 stars and wrote "It is hard to believe that anybody would make a film such as this in 2022. The girls of Raksha Bandhan, like the film itself, are caught in a time warp". Monika Rawal Kukreja of The Hindustan Times stated "Akshay Kumar's films delivers a strong message on dowry without trivialising the issue while managing to be an entertaining watch".

References

External links 
 

Raksha Bandhan Album at Hungama Music

2022 films
2020s Hindi-language films
Indian comedy-drama films
2022 comedy-drama films
Films about siblings
Indian drama films
Films about marriage
Films set in Delhi
Films shot in Delhi
Films about Indian weddings
Films about social issues in India
Films scored by Himesh Reshammiya